Jakob Butturff (born April 28, 1994) is a left-handed American ten-pin bowler from Chandler, Arizona and a member of the Professional Bowlers Association. He competes in events on the PBA Tour and in global events as a member of Team USA. He has won seven national PBA Tour titles (including one major) and 27 PBA Regional Tour titles. Jakob also rolled the 28th of the PBA Tour's 34 televised 300 games.

Butturff is a member of the Columbia 300 and Vise Grips pro staffs.

Amateur career
Butturff finished first at the 2017 Team USA Trials, and has been a Team USA member from 2017 through 2019. He won a team gold medal at the 2017 World Bowling Championships.

Butturff and his Team USA teammates won the 2019 Weber Cup over Team Europe. At the 2019 Pan American Games in Peru, Butturff and Team USA teammate Nick Pate earned a gold medal in doubles. During qualifying for this event, Jakob broke the Pan American Games record for a six-game block with a score of 1,516. In the next six-game block, he broke his own record with a 1,538 score. He also earned a bronze medal in the singles event.

Butturff was part of the rotating four-person team (with A. J. Johnson, Andrew Anderson and Kristopher Prather) that won the trios gold medal for Team USA at the 2021 International Bowling Federation (IBF) Super World Championships in Dubai.

Professional bowling career
Butturff became a PBA member in 2015, bowling primarily on the PBA Regional circuit that season. He won his first PBA Tour title in the 2016 PBA Xtra Frame Lubbock Sports Open.  In October that same year, he won the PBA South Point Las Vegas Open for his second title.

While he had no PBA Tour victories in the 2017 season, Butturff did win the title at the QubicaAMF World Cup on November 11 in Hermosillo, Mexico. Butturff had a chance to win his first major championship at the 2017 U.S. Open. He qualified as the #1 seed, leading his next-closest competitor by an astounding 617 pins, but he lost the televised championship match to Rhino Page, 256–222.

Butturff won the Go Bowling! PBA 60th Anniversary classic in February 2018 for his third PBA Tour title, and first on national television.  He then won the PBA Xtra Frame Kenn-Feld Group Classic in August for his fourth title. In October 2018, Butturff qualified as the #1 seed at the U.S. Open for a second straight season, but again lost the final match, this time by a single pin to England's Dominic Barrett on October 31. Butturff joined PBA Hall of Famer Earl Anthony as the only two bowlers to be the top qualifier in back-to-back U.S. Opens during the modern era (since 1971). Coincidentally, Anthony also lost the final match in both years (1979 and 1980).

Butturff qualified as the #1 seed for the first two tournaments of the 2019 PBA Tour season, joining Johnny Petraglia, Earl Anthony and Walter Ray Williams Jr. as the only players to be the top qualifier in three consecutive PBA Tour events (going back to the final event of the 2018 season). Butturff lost the title match in the season-opening PBA Hall of Fame classic, but won the PBA Oklahoma Open the following week for his fifth PBA Tour title. He captured his sixth PBA Tour title and first major at the 2019 USBC Masters, qualifying as the #1 seed for the stepladder finals and defeating Mykel Holliman in the championship match for the win. Butturff won his seventh PBA title and third of the 2019 season on June 30 at the Lubbock Sports Shootout. He has also had runner-up finishes in 2019 at the PBA World Championship, DHC PBA Japan Invitational, and Barbasol PBA Tour Finals. On October 21, Jakob won the $50,000 winner-take-all top prize in the PBA Clash. This was a non-title made-for-TV event featuring the 2019 season's top eight money leaders, and was broadcast November 3 on Fox. Butturff finished second to Jason Belmonte in the 2019 PBA Player of the Year voting.

In the 2021 PBA World Championship, Butturff charged from the #3 seed to the final match, but had to settle for his second runner-up finish in this major tournament, falling to top seed Tom Daugherty in the final match, 263–257. Butturff also finished runner-up to Chris Via, 214–213, in the 2021 U.S. Open. This was his third runner-up finish in the event, and the second time he lost the final match by a single pin. Despite not winning a tournament in 2021, Butturff rebounded in earnings after a disappointing 2020 season, collecting $111,850.

Butturff has rolled 19 career perfect 300 games in PBA competition, including the PBA's 28th televised 300 game, which he bowled on July 18, 2020 in the seeding round for the PBA Tour Playoffs broadcast on CBS Sports Network.

PBA Tour wins
Major championships are in bold type.

2016: Xtra Frame Lubbock Sports Open (Lubbock, TX)
2016: South Point Las Vegas Open (Las Vegas, NV)
2018: Go Bowling! PBA 60th Anniversary Classic (Indianapolis, IN)
2018: Xtra Frame Kenn-Feld Group Classic (Coldwater, OH)
2019: PBA Oklahoma Open (Shawnee, OK)
2019: USBC Masters (Las Vegas, NV)
2019: Lubbock Sports Shootout (Lubbock, TX)

Regional Tour success
In addition to his national PBA Tour titles, Butturff has won 27 PBA Regional Tour titles, including a PBA-record nine Regional titles in the 2016 season alone. His 20th title came in just his 59th PBA Regional tournament on January 20, 2019. Of the 38 players to date with at least 20 Regional titles, Butturff is recognized as the youngest (age 24) to reach the plateau.

Bowling style
Butturff has a unique delivery, in part due to being double-jointed with “hypermobility” in his wrist. According to bowling coach and author Bill Spigner, Butturff's starting wrist position is “almost an impossible position for someone with normal flexibility to achieve.” This allows Jakob to impart high revolutions on his shot, achieving an RPM rate comparable to many two-handed bowlers. For this reason, Butturff frequently uses an older technology urethane bowling ball instead of reactive equipment.

Career statistics
Statistics are through the last complete PBA Tour season.

+CRA = Championship Round Appearances

References

External links
 Jakob Butturff's Profile at PBA.com

American ten-pin bowling players
1994 births
Living people
Pan American Games medalists in bowling
Pan American Games gold medalists for the United States
Pan American Games bronze medalists for the United States
Bowlers at the 2019 Pan American Games
Medalists at the 2019 Pan American Games